The 1990 South Australian National Football League season was the 111th season of the top-level Australian rules football competition in South Australia.
The season opened on Saturday 14 April with all of the opening round matches simultaneously, and concluded on Sunday 7 October with the Grand Final in which Port Adelaide (minor premiers) won its 30th premiership by defeating Glenelg (second at the end of the minor rounds).

North Adelaide, Norwood and South Adelaide also made the top (final) five teams and participated in the finals matches. West Adelaide, Central District, Woodville, West Torrens and Sturt all missed the top five, with the latter finishing last to win its 12th wooden spoon.

This was the last SANFL season before the introduction of the Adelaide Crows into the Australian Football League. This effectively relegating the SANFL to second tier status in South Australia.

1990 Foundation Cup

Grand Final

	

	 	

 	
This was the third time Woodville reached a Grand Final of any kind during its existence as a stand-alone club.

1990 SANFL minor rounds

Round 1

Round 2

Round 3

Round 4

Round 5

Round 6

Round 7

Round 8

Round 9

Round 10

Round 11

Round 12

Round 13

Round 14

Round 15

Round 16

Round 17

Round 18

Round 19

Round 20

 and  play their final senior match as independent clubs before merging to become  from 1991 onwards. West Torrens player Ian Hanna, who career had ended due to a broken neck, was sent on the field in the dying minutes. With the game won, Woodville players "allowed" him to kick a goal.

Ladder

Finals series

Week 1

Week 2

Week 3

Week 4

References

SANFL
South Australian National Football League seasons